Charles Grant Blairfindie Allen (February 24, 1848 – October 25, 1899) was a Canadian science writer and novelist, educated in England. He was a public promoter of evolution in the second half of the nineteenth century.

Biography

Early life and education
Allen was born on Wolfe Island near Kingston, Canada West (known as Ontario after Confederation), the second son of Catharine Ann Grant and the Rev. Joseph Antisell Allen, a Protestant minister from Dublin, Ireland. His mother was a daughter of the fifth Baron de Longueuil. Allen was educated at home until, at age 13, he and his parents moved to the United States, then to France, and finally to the United Kingdom. He was educated at King Edward's School in Birmingham and at Merton College in Oxford, both in the United Kingdom.

After graduation, Allen studied in France, taught at Brighton College in 1870–71, and in his mid-twenties became a professor at Queen's College, a black college in Jamaica. Despite being the son of a minister, Allen became an atheist and a socialist.

Writing career
After leaving his professorship, in 1876 he returned to England, where he turned his talents to writing, gaining a reputation for his essays on science and for literary works. A 2007 book by Oliver Sacks cites with approval one of Allen's early articles, "Note-Deafness" (a description of what became known as amusia, published in 1878 in the learned journal Mind).

Allen's first books dealt with scientific subjects, and include Physiological Æsthetics (1877) and Flowers and Their Pedigrees (1886) He was first influenced by associationist psychology as expounded by Alexander Bain and by Herbert Spencer, the latter who especially espoused the transition from associationist psychology to Darwinian functionalism. In Allen's many articles on flowers and on perception in insects, Darwinian arguments replaced the old Spencerian terms, leading to a  radically new vision of plant life that influenced H.G. Wells and helped transform later botanical research.

On a personal level, a long friendship that started when Allen met Spencer on his return from Jamaica grew uneasy over the years. Allen wrote a critical and revealing biographical article on Spencer that was published after Spencer's death.

After assisting Sir W. W. Hunter with his Gazetteer of India in the early 1880s, Allen turned his attention to fiction, and between 1884 and 1899 produced about 30 novels. In 1895, his scandalous book titled The Woman Who Did, promulgating certain startling views on marriage and kindred questions, became a bestseller. The book told the story of an independent woman who has a child out of wedlock. Owing to his concern with these subjects, Allen was associated with Thomas Hardy, whose novel Jude the Obscure (1895) was published the same year as The Woman Who Did.

In his career, Allen wrote two novels under female pseudonyms. One of these, the short novel The Type-writer Girl, he wrote under the name Olive Pratt Rayner.

Another work, The Evolution of the Idea of God (1897), propounds a theory of religion on heterodox lines comparable to Herbert Spencer's "ghost theory". Allen's theory became well known and brief references to it appear in a review by Marcel Mauss, Durkheim's nephew, in the articles of William James and in the works of Sigmund Freud. The young G. K. Chesterton wrote on what he considered the flawed premise of the idea, arguing that the idea of God preceded human mythologies, rather than developing from them. Chesterton said of Allen's book on the evolution of the idea of God: "it would be much more interesting if God wrote a book on the evolution of the idea of Grant Allen".

Allen also became a pioneer in science fiction, with the novel The British Barbarians (1895) This book, published about the same time as H. G. Wells's The Time Machine (which appeared in January–May 1895, and which includes a mention of Allen), also described time travel, although the plot is quite different. Allen's short story The Thames Valley Catastrophe (published December 1897 in The Strand Magazine) describes the destruction of London by a sudden and massive volcanic eruption.

Ancestry

Personal life
Allen married twice, first to Caroline Ann Bootheway (1846–1871) and secondly to Ellen Jerrard (b, 1853) with whom he had one son, Jerrard Grant Allen (1878–1946), a theatrical agent/manager who in 1913 married the actress and singer Violet Englefield. They had a son, Reginald "Reggie" Grant Allen (1910-1985).

Grant Allen's nephew, Grant Richards, was a writer and publisher who founded the Grant Richards publishing house. Allen encouraged his nephew's interest in books and publishing and helped him obtain his first positions in the book trade. Richards was later to publish a number of books written by his uncle, including The Evolution of the Idea of God and those in the book series Grant Allen's Historical Guides.

Allen's nieces by marriage, novelist Netta Syrett, and artists Mabel Syrett and Nellie Syrret all contributed work to The Yellow Book.

In 1893 Allen left London for the hills around the Devil's Punch Bowl, enthusing on the advantages of the change of scene: "Up here on the free hills, the sharp air blows in upon us, limpid and clear from a thousand leagues of open ocean; down there in the stagnant town, it stagnates and ferments."

Death and posthumous publication
Grant Allen died of liver cancer at his home on Hindhead, Haslemere, Surrey, England, on October 25, 1899. He died before finishing Hilda Wade. The novel's final episode, which he dictated to his friend, doctor and neighbor Sir Arthur Conan Doyle from his bed, appeared under the appropriate title, "The Episode of the Dead Man Who Spoke" in the Strand Magazine in 1900.

Legacy
Many histories of detective fiction mention Allen as an innovator. The illustrious Colonel Clay is a precursor of other gentleman rogue characters; he notably bears a strong resemblance to Maurice Leblanc's Arsène Lupin, introduced some years later, and both Miss Cayley's Adventures and Hilda Wade feature early female detectives.

The Scene of the Crime Festival, an annual festival celebrating Canadian mystery fiction, takes place annually on Wolfe Island, Ontario, near Kingston, Allen's birthplace and honors Allen.

A metal arch commemorating Allen, was designed by Lucy Quinnell and installed at the entrance to Allen Court in Dorking, Surrey in 2013.

Quotes

What a misfortune it is that we should thus be compelled to let our boys' schooling interfere with their education!

Partial bibliography

Books
(1877) Physiological Esthetics
(1879) The Colour-Sense: Its Origin and Development
(1881) Evolutionist at Large
(1881) Vignettes from Nature
(1882) The Colours of Flowers
(1883) Colin Clout's Calendar
(1883) Flowers and Their Pedigrees
(1884) Philistia. Allen's FIRST NOVEL
(1884) Strange Stories. Short Stories
(1885) Babylon. A novel in 3 volumes
(1885) Charles Darwin. (English Worthies)
(1886) For Mamie's Sake
(1886) In All Shades
(1887) The Beckoning Hand and Other Stories. Short Stories
(1888) This Mortal Coil: A Novel
(1888) Force and Energy
(1888) The Devil's Die
(1888) The White Man's Foot
(1889) Falling in Love
(1889) The Tents of Shem
(1890) Wednesday the Tenth
(1890) The Great Taboo
(1891) Dumaresq's Daughter
(1891) What's Bred in the Bone
(1892) Pallinghurst Barrow. Short Story.
(1892) The Duchess of Powysland
(1893) The Scallywag
(1893) Michael's Crag
(1894) The Lower Slopes
(1894) Post-Prandial Philosophy
(1895) The British Barbarians
(1895) At Market Value
(1895) The Story of the Plants
(1895) The Desire of the Eyes
(1895) The Woman Who Did
(1896) The Jaws of Death
(1896) A Bride from the Desert
(1896) Under Sealed Orders
(1896) Moorland Idylls
(1897) Kalee's Shrine
(1897) An African Millionaire: Episodes in the Life of the Illustrious Colonel Clay
(1897) The Evolution of the Idea of God
(1897) Paris (Grant Allen's Historical Guides)
(1897) Florence (Grant Allen's Historical Guides)
(1897) Cities of Belgium (Grant Allen's Historical Guides)
(1897) The Type-writer Girl (as Olive Pratt Rayner)
(1897) Tom, Unlimited (as Martin Leach Warborough)
(1898) 
(1898) The Incidental Bishop
(1898) Venice. (Grant Allen's Historical Guides)
(1899) The European Tour
(1899) A Splendid Sin
(1899) Miss Cayley's Adventures. Detective novel
(1899) Twelve Tales: With a Headpiece, a Tailpiece, and an Intermezzo
(1900) Hilda Wade. Detective novel finished by Arthur Conan Doyle
(1900) Linnet
(1901) The Backslider
(1901) In Nature's Workshop
(1908) Evolution in Italian Art
(1909) The Hand of God
(1909) The Plants

Selected articles
(1878) "Hellas and Civilization," Gentleman's Magazine, Vol. CCXLIII, pp. 156–170
(1878) "Nation-making: A Theory of National Characters," Gentleman's Magazine, Vol. CCXLIII, pp. 580–591
(1880) "Why Keep India?," The Contemporary Review, Vol. XXXVIII, pp. 544–556
(1880) "The Growth of Sculpture," The Cornhill Magazine, Vol. XLII, pp. 273–293
(1880) "The English Chronicle," Gentleman's Magazine, Vol. CCXLVI, pp. 543–559
(1880) "The Venerable Bede," Gentleman's Magazine, Vol. CCXLIX, pp. 84–100
(1880) "The Dog's Universe," Gentleman's Magazine, Vol. CCXLIX, pp. 287–301
(1880) "Evolution and Geological Time," Gentleman's Magazine, Vol. CCXLIX, pp. 563–579
(1881) "The Story of Wulfgeat," Gentleman's Magazine, Vol. CCLI, pp. 551–561
(1882) "An English Shire," Gentleman's Magazine, Vol. CCLII, pp. 49–70
(1882) "The Welsh in the West Country," Gentleman's Magazine, Vol. CCLIII, pp. 179–197
(1882) "The Colours of Flowers," The Cornhill Magazine, Vol. XLV,  pp. 19–34
(1882) "An English Weed," The Cornhill Magazine, Vol. XLV, pp. 542–554
(1883) "Honeysuckle," Gentleman's Magazine, Vol. CCLV, pp. 313–322
(1884) "The Garden Snail," Gentleman's Magazine, Vol. CCLVI, pp. 25–34
(1884) "Our Debt to Insects," Gentleman's Magazine, Vol. CCLVI, pp. 452–469
(1886) "A Thinking Machine," Gentleman's Magazine, Vol. CCLX, pp. 30–41
(1889) "From Africa," Gentleman's Magazine, Vol. CCLXVII, pp. 547–557
(1890) "The Girl of the Future," Universal Review, Vol. VII, p. 57
(1891) "Democracy and Diamonds," The Contemporary Review, Vol. LIX, pp. 669–677

Further reading
Allen, Grant (1894) "Physiological Aesthetics' and 'Philistia'." In: My First Book. With an Introduction by Jerome K. Jerome. London: Chatto & Windus.
Bleiler, Everett (1948) The Checklist of Fantastic Literature. Chicago: Shasta Publishers, p. 104.
Chislett, William (1967) "Grant Allen, Naturalist and Novelist." In: Moderns and Near-moderns. Freeport, N.Y.: Books for Libraries Press, pp. 198–211.
Clodd, Edward (1900) Grant Allen: A Memoir. London: Grant Richards.
Jackson, Holbrook (1913) The Eighteen Nineties. London: Grant Richards Ltd.
Le Gallienne, Richard (1910) "Grant Allen." In: Attitudes and Avowals. New York: John Lane Company.
Melchiori, Barbara Arnett (2000) Grant Allen: The Downward Path which Leads to Fiction. Rome: Bulzoni Editore 
Morton, Peter (2005) "The Busiest Man in England": Grant Allen and the Writing Trade, 1875–1900. London: Palgrave.
Tompkins, Herbert W. (1904) "Grant Allen," The Gentleman's Magazine, Vol. CCXCVIII, pp. 134–149.

Sources

 Includes Grant Allen.

References

External links

The Grant Allen Website

1848 births
1899 deaths
Canadian agnostics
Canadian science writers
Canadian male novelists
Canadian non-fiction writers
Writers from Kingston, Ontario
Canadian people of English descent
Canadian people of Irish descent
Charles Darwin biographers
Male feminists
Pre-Confederation Ontario people
Persons of National Historic Significance (Canada)
19th-century Canadian novelists
Alumni of Merton College, Oxford
Deaths from liver cancer
19th-century male writers
Canadian socialist feminists
Male non-fiction writers